Henri Guerbois (born 1885, date of death unknown) was a French architect. His work was part of the architecture event in the art competition at the 1924 Summer Olympics.

References

1885 births
Year of death missing
19th-century French architects
20th-century French architects
Olympic competitors in art competitions
Place of birth missing